Marumba is a genus of moths in the family Sphingidae first described by Frederic Moore in 1882.

Species
Marumba amboinicus (C. Felder, 1861)
Marumba cristata (Butler, 1875)
Marumba diehli Roesler & Kuppers, 1975
Marumba dyras (Walker, 1865)
Marumba fenzelii Mell, 1937
Marumba gaschkewitschii (Bremer & Grey, 1853)
Marumba indicus (Walker, 1856)
Marumba jankowskii (Oberthur, 1880)
Marumba juvencus Rothschild & Jordan, 1912
Marumba maackii (Bremer, 1861)
Marumba nympha (Rothschild & Jordan, 1903)
Marumba poliotis Hampson, 1907
Marumba quercus (Denis & Schiffermuller, 1775)
Marumba saishiuana Okamoto, 1924
Marumba spectabilis (Butler, 1875)
Marumba sperchius (Menetries, 1857)
Marumba tigrina Gehlen, 1936
Marumba timora (Rothschild & Jordan, 1903)

Gallery

References 

 
Smerinthini
Moth genera
Taxa named by Frederic Moore